Directorate for Science and Technology may refer to:
Central Intelligence Agency Directorate of Science & Technology
DHS Directorate for Science and Technology

See also
Department of Science and Technology (disambiguation)